Beat of Life Vol. 1 is the second album by Polish-born German hip hop producer DJ Tomekk. It was released on in late 2002 through Modul/BMG. Produced entirely by Tomekk and Thomas Schmidt, it features guest appearances from German musicians Trooper Da Don, G-Style, MC Spontan, Sandra Nasić, Shadee, Tatwaffe, Clumsy & Shegun, as well as American hip hop acts, such as the Perverted Monks, The Beatnuts, Ice-T, Kurupt, Lil' Kim, Trigga tha Gambler, Fatman Scoop, and Jamaican recording artist Prezident Brown. The album peaked at number 55 in Germany. It was supported by two charted singles: "Kimnotyze" and "Beat of Life".

Track listing

Personnel
Tomasz "DJ Tomekk" Kuklicz – producer, mixing
Thomas Kristian Schmidt – producer, mixing
Hanse Warns – mastering

Charts

References

External links 
 

2002 albums
Hip hop albums by German artists